Akeomi Nitta (新田明臣, born July 23, 1973) is a Japanese kickboxer. He is one of Japan's kickboxers in the welterweight division.

Biography

Karate to kickboxing
In elementary school Akeomi Nitta loved baseball; during junior high he chose not to pursue sports, instead concentrating on other activities.  Daido-juku karate rekindled his interest, and he won the first tournament that he participated in although he was only a white belt (beginner) at the time.  Soon after he met his teacher, Mr. Katsuyama, and became a pupil of S.V.G., a kickboxing gym, he won the championship of Shin-karate absolute class by knocking out all his opponents.

As a kickboxer
He knocked out his opponent again in his first professional match, and the future welterweight champion of the New Japan Kickboxing Federation, Hiroshi Suzuki, in his second. He knocked out another future welterweight champion, of the All Japan Kickboxing Federation, Tatsuya Suzuki, and won 12 straight matches from April 1994 to September 1998. In October 1996, he won the New Japan Kickboxing Federation Middleweight championship title. In March 2000, he defeated Mohammed Owali, the WPKL World Super welterweight champion who no other Japanese kickboxer had been able to defeat. Two months later, he beat an Italian kickboxer and won the title of WKA World Thai Boxing Super Welterweight champion in Milan, Italy. Later, he won the All Japan Kickboxing Federation Middleweight Championship.

Challenge to K-1 
He had several K-1 matches, notably against Ramon Dekkers of the Netherlands—called "the strongest kickboxer of 20th century"—which ended in a draw.  Dekker later said that Nitta was the strongest Japanese kickboxer. Nitta also KO'd American Kit Cope in K-1.
In 2002 he participated in the K-1 WORLD MAX Japan Tournament, but was knocked out by Takashi Ohno, ISKA World Oriental Super Middleweight champion. In 2005 he defeated Ash-Ra, Takehiro Murahama and Koutetsu Boku while losing to Takayuki Kohiruimaki and Ian James Schaffa. In 2006 he lost to Yoshihiro Sato.

As a coach
He founded his own kickboxing gym named "BUNGELING BAY", and served as its president.

Titles and accomplishments
New Japan Kickboxing Federation
 1996 NJKF Middleweight Champion (defended twice)
All Japan Kickboxing Federation
 1999 AJKF Middleweight Champion
World Kickboxing Association
 2000 W.K.A. World Muay Thai Super Welterweight Champion
IKUSA
 2004 IKUSA -70kg Champion
K-1
 2005 K1 World MAX Japan tournament Runner-up
Universal Kickboxing Federation
 2007 UKF World Middleweight Champion

Kickboxing record

|-  bgcolor="#fbb"
| 2008-01-13 || Loss||align=left| Jan Kaszuba || BUNGELING BAY ～enishi～  || Tokyo, Japan || Decision (Split) || 3 || 3:00
|-  bgcolor="#cfc"
| 2007-04-22 || Win||align=left| Yuji Goto || SNKA TITANS NEOS || Tokyo, Japan || Decision (Majority) || 3 || 3:00
|-  bgcolor="#fbb"
| 2007-03-04 || Loss ||align=left| Kuntap Weerasakreck || M-1 FAIRTEX SINGHA BEER MuayThai Challenge 〜BATTLES OF FATE 2007〜  || Japan || Decision (Unanimous) || 5 || 3:00
|-
! style=background:white colspan=9 |
|-  bgcolor="#cfc"
| 2007-01-21 || Win||align=left| Majit "The Magic Man"|| Benny the Jet Produces BURAIKAN- J・BOY  || Yokohama, Japan || Decision (Majority) || 5 || 3:00
|-
! style=background:white colspan=9 |
|-  bgcolor="#cfc"
| 2006-11-22 || Win||align=left| Daniel Smik || J-NETWORK MACH GO! GO! '06  || Tokyo, Japan || Decision (Unanimous) || 3 || 3:00
|-  bgcolor="#fbb"
| 2006-04-28 || Loss||align=left| Ali Gunyar|| SNKA TITANS 3rd || Tokyo, Japan || Decision (Majority) || 5 || 3:00
|-  bgcolor=#fbb
| 2006-02-04 || Loss||align=left| Yoshihiro Sato || K-1 World MAX 2006 Japan Tournament || Saitama, Japan || Decision (Unanimous) || 3 || 3:00
|-  bgcolor="#c5d2ea"
| 2005-12-18 || Draw||align=left| Soren Monkongtong|| SNKA FINAL 2005 || Tokyo, Japan || Decision  || 5 || 3:00
|-  bgcolor="#fbb"
| 2005-10-12 || Loss||align=left| Ian Schaffa|| K-1 World MAX 2005 Champions Challenge || Tokyo, Japan || Decision (Unanimous) || 5 || 3:00
|-  bgcolor="#fbb"
| 2005-08-22 || Loss||align=left| Shin Noppadetsorn|| SNKA TITANS 2nd  || Tokyo, Japan || Decision (Unanimous) || 5 || 3:00
|-  bgcolor="#cfc"
| 2005-07-20 || Win||align=left| Kotetsu Boku|| K-1 World MAX 2005 Championship Final  || Yokohama, Japan || Decision (Unanimous) || 3 || 3:00
|-  bgcolor="#fbb"
| 2005-06-18 || Loss||align=left| Kojiro || IKUSA GP -U60 SUPERSTAR☆Z TOURNAMENT -Opening Stage-  || Tokyo, Japan || Decision (Unanimous) || 5 || 3:00
|-
! style=background:white colspan=9 |
|-  bgcolor="#cfc"
| 2005-05-06 || Win||align=left| Tetsuya Yamauchi || J-NETWORK「GO! GO! J-NET '05 -volcano-  || Tokyo, Japan || Decision (Unanimous) || 3 || 3:00
|-  bgcolor="#fbb"
| 2005-02-23 || Loss||align=left| Taishin Kohiruimaki || K-1 World MAX 2005 Japan Tournament Final || Tokyo, Japan || KO (Right Front Kick) || 1 || 0:36 
|-
! style=background:white colspan=9 |
|-
|-  bgcolor="#CCFFCC"
| 2005-02-23 || Win ||align=left| Takehiro Murahama || K-1 World MAX 2005 Japan Tournament semi-finals || Tokyo, Japan || Decision (Unanimous) || 3 || 3:00 
|-
|-  bgcolor="#CCFFCC"
| 2005-02-23 || Win ||align=left| ASH-RA || K-1 World MAX 2005 Japan Tournament, Reserve Fight || Tokyo, Japan || TKO (Low Kick)  || 2 || 2:10
|-  bgcolor="#cfc"
| 2005-01-21 || Win||align=left| Nick Fiordo|| J-NETWORK GO! GO! J-NET '05 -volcano-  || Tokyo, Japan || Decision (Unanimous) || 3 || 3:00
|-  bgcolor="#cfc"
| 2004-11-26 || Win||align=left| David Archuleta || FUTURE FIGHTER IKUSA 6 〜(SORA)〜 GANGSTAR☆Z  || Tokyo, Japan || Decision (Unanimous) || 5 || 3:00
|-
! style=background:white colspan=9 |
|-  bgcolor="#cfc"
| 2004-07-10 || Win||align=left| Ngakau Spain || IKUSA YOUNG GUNNERES 3 〜RETURNS〜 || Tokyo, Japan || TKO (Low Kick) || 2 || 2:59
|-  bgcolor="#fbb"
| 2003-12-06 || Loss ||align=left| Gregory Swerts || SuperLeague Netherlands 2003 || Rotterdam, Netherlands || Decision || 5 || 3:00
|-  bgcolor="#fbb"
| 2003-09-27 || Loss ||align=left| Fadi Merza || SuperLeague Germany 2003 || Germany || Decision || 5 || 3:00
|-  bgcolor="#CCFFCC"
| 2002-12-08 || Win ||align=left| Sak Nayagam || AJKF BACK FROM HELL - II" || Tokyo, Japan || KO (3 Knockdowns) ||2 || 2:10
|-  bgcolor="#fbb"
| 2002-02-11 || Loss||align=left| Takashi Ohno || K-1 World MAX 2002 Japan Tournament, quarter-finals || Tokyo, Japan || KO (Left High Kick) || 1 || 2:28
|-  bgcolor="#fbb"
| 2001-07-22 || Loss||align=left| Takashi Ohno || AJKF BLAZE UP || Tokyo, Japan || KO (Left Knee)|| 4 || 1:37
|-  bgcolor="#cfc"
| 2001-01-04 || Win ||align=left| Takahiko Shimizu || AJKF THE CHAMPIONSHIP || Tokyo, Japan || Decision (Unanimous)|| 5 || 3:00  
|-
! style=background:white colspan=9 |
|-  bgcolor="#cfc"
| 2000-11-29 || Win ||align=left| Raphael Tai || AJKF Legend X || Tokyo, Japan || Decision || 5 || 3:00
|-  style="background:#c5d2ea;"
| 2000-11-01 || Draw ||align=left| Ramon Dekkers || K-1 J-MAX 2000 || Tokyo, Japan || Decision (Majority) || 5 || 3:00
|-  bgcolor="#fbb"
| 2000-09-13 || Loss||align=left| Shane Chapman || AJKF Legend VIII || Tokyo, Japan || Decision || 5 || 3:00
|-  bgcolor="#fbb"
| 2000-09-03 || Loss||align=left| Peter Crooke || AJKF LEGEND-VII || Tokyo, Japan || Decision (Majority)|| 5 || 3:00
|-  bgcolor="#cfc"
| 2000-07-30 || Win||align=left| Matteo Sciacca || AJKF LEGEND-VII || Tokyo, Japan || TKO (Low Kick)|| 3 || 0:50
|-  bgcolor="#cfc"
| 2000-05-24 || Win||align=left| Norm Graham|| AJKF LEGEND-V || Tokyo, Japan || Decision (Unanimous)|| 5 || 3:00
|-  bgcolor="#cfc"
| 2000-05-06 || Win||align=left| Stefano Stradella ||  || Italy || TKO || 3 || 2:50
|-
! style=background:white colspan=9 |
|-  bgcolor="#cfc"
| 2000-03-16 || Win||align=left| Mohammed Ouali || AJKF LEGEND-III || Tokyo, Japan || Decision (Split)|| 5 || 3:00
|-  bgcolor="#cfc"
| 2000-02-20 || Win||align=left| Tetsushi Fujihara || AJKF LEGEND-II || Tokyo, Japan || KO (High Kick)|| 3 || 1:12
|-  bgcolor="#cfc"
| 1999-11-22 || Win ||align=left| Kit Cope || AJKF: WAVE-XIII || Tokyo, Japan || KO (high kick) || 3 || 2:21
|-  bgcolor="#c5d2ea"
| 1999-05-24 || Draw ||align=left| Shane Chapman || New Japan Kickboxing "Achievement 3" || Tokyo, Japan || Decision Draw || 5 || 3:00
|-  bgcolor="#fbb"
| 1999-01-24 || Loss||align=left| Shigeru Ooba || NJKF || Tokyo, Japan || TKO || 2 ||
|-  bgcolor="#fbb"
| 1998-10-09 || Loss||align=left| Numponton BangkokStore || NJKF || Tokyo, Japan || Decision || 5 || 3:00
|-  bgcolor="#cfc"
| 1998-09-11 || Win||align=left| Sidy Kone || Lumpini Stadium || Bangkok, Thailand || Decision || 5 || 3:00
|-  bgcolor="#cfc"
| 1998-05-31 || Win||align=left| Tetsushi Fujihara ||  || Japan || KO || 3 ||
|-  bgcolor="#cfc"
| 1997-12-21 || Win||align=left| Taishin Kohiruimaki || J-Network "J-Prestage" || Tokyo, Japan || KO (Low Kicks) || 4 || 2:13
|-  bgcolor="#cfc"
| 1996-10- || Win||align=left| Minoru Suzuki|| NJKF || Tokyo, Japan || Decision || 5 || 3:00  
|-
! style=background:white colspan=9 |
|-
| colspan=9 | Legend:

See also
List of K-1 events
List of male kickboxers

References

External links
Official website of Akeomi Nitta(Japanese)

Japanese male kickboxers
Welterweight kickboxers
Japanese male karateka
Sportspeople from Tokyo
Living people
1973 births